Hyrcania (Arabic: خربة المرد "Khirbet el-Mird") was an ancient fortress in the Judean Desert. It was built by Hasmonean ruler John Hyrcanus or his son Alexander Jannaeus in the 2nd or 1st century BCE. During the Byzantine period, a monastery named Kastellion was established on the ruined fort; its remains can still be seen today.

The site is located on an isolated hill about 200 m above the Hyrcania valley, on its western edge. It is about 5 km west of Qumran, and 16 km east of Jerusalem. The site has not yet been thoroughly excavated. Current knowledge about the ruins of the site is based on a limited number of test pits.

History

Hasmonean fortress
Hyrcania is thought to have been founded by the Hasmonean king Alexander Jannaeus (ruled c. 103-76 BCE), while it's also likely that it was first established and named after Jannaeus' father, John Hyrcanus (ruled c. 134-104 BCE). The first mention of the fortress is during the reign of Salome Alexandra, the wife of Jannaeus, c. 75 BCE: Flavius Josephus relates that, along with Machaerus and Alexandrion, Hyrcania was one of three fortresses that the queen did not give up when she handed control of her strongholds to the Pharisee party.

The fortress is mentioned again in 57 BCE when Alexander of Judaea, son of Aristobulus II, fled from the Roman governor of Syria, Aulus Gabinius, who had come to suppress the revolt Alexander had stirred up against Hyrcanus II. Alexander made to re-fortify Hyrcania, but eventually surrendered to Gabinius. The fortress was then razed. The Greek geographer Strabo also notes the destruction, along with that of Alexandrion and Machaerus, the "haunts of the robbers and the treasure-holds of the tyrants", at the direction of Gabinius's superior, the Roman general Pompey.

Herodian fortress
Hyrcania is next reported in 33–32 BCE being used in an uprising against Herod the Great led by the sister of Herod's executed former rival Antigonus. The fortress was retaken, and extended; it became notorious as a place where Herod imprisoned and killed his enemies, ultimately including his own son and heir Antipater.

Monastery of Kastellion
In later times St Sabbas the Sanctified founded a residence (cenobium) for hermits on the site in 492 CE, called the Kastellion, part of the satellite community or lavra associated with the monastery at Mar Saba 4 km to the south-west. Hermits remained until the 14th century, with a brief attempt made to re-establish the community between 1923 and 1939. This identification is based on Vita Sabae, the vita or biography of St Sabbas, and is generally accepted by researchers. The Aramaic descriptive term marda, "fortress", corresponds in meaning to the Greek name Kastellion, but should not be seen as a proper name for the site, Marda as a location name being reserved, as we can see from the vita of St Euthymius, for Masada, the Herodian palace-fortress near the Dead Sea which was briefly resettled by Byzantine monks.

Archaeology
Some have identified the Hyrcania valley below the fortress with the Biblical valley of Achor, which is identified in the Copper Scroll of the Dead Sea Scrolls as the site of a great treasure. This has led to interest by treasure hunters in the area, despite it being subject to live-fire exercises by the Israeli army. Two ancient stepped tunnels cut down into the rock for a distance of 50 metres nearby were cleared of debris and sand in an investigation led by Oren Gutfeld of Hebrew University, but yielded only a Hasmonean-period clay pot and a skeleton.

Papyri/Parchments
A large group of papyri, remnants of one or more monastic libraries of the 7th and 8th centuries AD, were excavated at the site in 1950 and now reside at the University of Leuven and the Palestine Archaeological Museum (Rockefeller Museum). Among the text finds is a 6th-century Christian Palestinian Aramaic parchment fragment, designated syrmsK, which preserves the Western text-type of Acts 10:28-29, 32–41. next to a number of other witnesses of Joshua, Luke and John, Colossians.

Other findings 
Among other findings are two pieces of a Jewish monumental stone inscription from the second or first century CE, which was inscribed in Aramaic and professionally carved using the Jewish script. Another discovery is a burial cave that most likely served as a necropolis for the monks of the Monastery of Kastellion during the Byzantine period and contains murals of 36 saints; a few of them were intentionally vandalized. In the neighboring Kh. el-Mird cave, a Christian Palestinian Aramaic inscription mentioning Jesus was discovered.

See also
Hasmonean desert fortresses
 Alexandreion/Alexandrion/Alexandrium
 Dok (Dagon) on the Mount of Temptation
 Cypros (German article)
 Machaerus

References

Further reading
 O. Gutfeld (2008), "Hyrcania", in: E. Stern (ed.), The New Encyclopedia of Archaeological Excavations in the Holy Land, Vol. 5, pp. 1787–1788.

External links

Archaeological sites in the West Bank
Jews and Judaism in the Roman Republic
Tourist attractions in the State of Palestine
Judaean Desert